Curtisville is an unincorporated community in Madison Township, Tipton County, in the U.S. state of Indiana.

The community is part of the Kokomo, Indiana Metropolitan Statistical Area.

History

Curtisville was founded by L.B. Colvin just prior to 1859. Colvin built a sawmill on the railroad that traveled through Madison Township and sold as much lumber as possible so he could secure a train station. Around the same time the first retail operations were opened in Curtisville, in a building on the east side of town that was built by A.B. Newman. Lumber remained the primarily economy for the town. Other services in Curtisville included blacksmithing.

In 1859, a post office was installed in Curtisville. Jacob Oldacre served as postmaster. The post office ran until it was discontinued in 1951. A Missionary Baptists congregation was founded in Curtisville in 1860. A church was built in 1861. The land was surveyed and divided into a plat in 1873. As of 1914, 200 people lived in town and the primary economic driver was the Curtisville Tile and Brick Company.

Geography

Footnotes

Sources
 Pershing, Marvin W. "History of Tipton County, Indiana: Her People, Industries and Institutions". Indianapolis: B.F. Bowen (1914).

Unincorporated communities in Tipton County, Indiana
Unincorporated communities in Indiana
Kokomo, Indiana metropolitan area